Artem Hryshyn was born on 16 October 1987) and is a Ukrainian football midfielder.

Club history
Before the transfer he played for FC Vorskla Poltava. He wore a jersey number 33.

External links
Official team website for FC Kremin Kremenchuk
FC Kremin Kremenchuk Squad
Official team website for FC Vorskla Poltava
Official team website for FC Kremin Kremenchuk
Player Statistics

References

1987 births
Living people
Ukrainian footballers
Ukrainian expatriate footballers
Expatriate footballers in Poland
FC Kremin Kremenchuk players
FC Vorskla Poltava players
FC Shakhtar Sverdlovsk players
Association football midfielders
Sportspeople from Poltava